Steponavičius is a Lithuanian language family name. It corresponds to East-Slavic Stepanovich and South Slavic Stepanović. The surname is derived from the name Stepan.

The surname may refer to:
 (1927), artist, a Lithuanian National Culture and Arts prize recipient
 (Birutė Janina Grasilda Žilytė-Steponavičienė) , graphic artist, recipient of the 2015 Lithuanian National Prize for Culture and Arts
Darius Steponavicuis, founder of Speed Factory Racing
Gintaras Steponavičius, Lithuanian politician, speaker of Seimas, minister of education
Julijonas Steponavičius, bishop of Vilnius

Lithuanian-language surnames